The San Diego Friars were an expansion franchise of World Team Tennis (WTT) founded in 1975. The Friars qualified for the WTT playoffs twice in their four seasons and won the 1978 Western Division Championship. The team folded following the 1978 season.

Team history

Founding and inaugural season

The Friars were founded by aerospace engineer and real estate developer Frank Mariani as the first expansion franchise of WTT just before the start of the 1975 season, and played most of their home matches at the San Diego Sports Arena. Some home matches were played at the Anaheim Convention Center. The Friars played a 46-match WTT regular-season schedule in 1975. The league used neutral-site matches to cut down on travel and create events where fans could see multiple teams either with one admission or over the course of a few days. These special events were called WTT Spectaculars. Because of these and because of scheduling challenges created when the Houston E-Z Riders suspended operations just days before the season started, the 10 teams in the league did not play an equal number of matches. Seven of them played 44 matches, while the Friars, Boston Lobsters and Hawaii Leis each played 46 matches. The Friars were led by player-coach Dennis Ralston and also featured Anand Amritraj, John Andrews, Brigitte Cuypers, Lesley Hunt and Janet Young. The Friars finished their inaugural season with 14 wins and 32 losses tied with the Leis for last place in the Western Division and the worst record in WTT.

Arrival of Laver
The Friars' top choices in the 1975 draft were Linky Boshoff, Nancy Gunter, Janice Metcalf, Charles Pasarell, Kazuko Sawamatsu. They left player-coach Dennis Ralston unprotected, and he was selected by the Pittsburgh Triangles in the second round. On February 16, 1976, after securing permission to negotiate from the Phoenix Racquets, the Friars signed the legendary Rod Laver to a contract for an undisclosed amount and an undisclosed length but which reportedly made him the highest-paid player in WTT history. The Friars also signed Cliff Drysdale and named him their player-coach. Other players taking the court for the 1976 Friars were Ross Case, Terry Holladay and Betty Ann Grubb Stuart. The team hired Larry Willens as an assistant coach. The Friars struggled again in 1976, finishing with 13 wins and 31 losses, fourth place in the Western Division. Despite the team's poor performance, Laver was named WTT Male Rookie of the Year.

First playoff berth
Cliff Drysdale and Rod Laver returned to the team in 1977. They signed Mona Guerrant, Julie Anthony and Kerry Reid. Ross Case went to the Phoenix Racquets and became their player-coach. The Friars finished the 1977 season with 21 wins and 23 losses, third place in the Western Division and qualified for the WTT playoffs.

The Friars opened the best-of-three Western Division Semifinals against the two-time defending Western Division Champion San Francisco Golden Gaters at Oakland-Alameda County Coliseum Arena on August 16, with a 24–22 victory. The Golden Gaters appeared to be on their way to victory leading 17–12 after three sets. Reid won the fourth set of women's singles, 6–1, against former Friar Terry Holladay to ties the match at 18. The following night, the Friars played their first home playoff match in franchise history and defeated the Golden Gaters, 24–21, to advance to the Western Division Championship Series. The Golden Gaters took a 20–18 lead to the final set of men's doubles. Drysdale and Laver defeated Tom Okker and Frew McMillan, 6–1, in the final set to win the match and the series.

The Friars met the Phoenix Racquets in the first match of the Western Division Championship Series at the Arizona Veterans Memorial Coliseum on August 20. Guerrant was the hero for the Friars taking part in two set wins playing doubles. She teamed with Reid to beat Chris Evert and Kristien Shaw in women's doubles, 6–2, and with Laver to beat Shaw and former Friar Ross Case in mixed doubles, 7–5. The Friars had a chance to win the series in San Diego on August 22, and the Racquets staved off elimination with a 27–20 victory despite Guerrant and Reid earning another 6–2 set win over Evert and Shaw. The series returned to Phoenix on August 23, and the Racquets cruised to a 30–22 win to eliminate the Friars.

A division championship
The Friars selected Tim Gullikson in the second round of the 1977 draft, but were unable to sign him. on March 8, 1978, the Friars traded Cliff Drysdale to the Anaheim Oranges for a first-round draft choice and cash. Following the trade, the Friars named Rod Laver as their new player-coach. Mona Guerrant and Kerry Reid returned to the team. The Friars signed Grover Raz Reid and re-signed their former players, Ross Case and Janet Young. The Friars had the first 
winning season in franchise history in 1978, posting 30 wins and 14 losses and winning the Western Division Championship which for the first time in WTT history was determined based on regular-season and not playoff results.

The Friars opened the best-of-three WTT Quarterfinals at home with a dominant victory over the Seattle Cascades, 30–22, on August 15. After Laver and Case dropped the opening set in men's doubles, 6–4, to Tom Gorman and Sherwood Stewart, the Friars won the next four sets. Laver had a 6–2 set win over Gorman in men's singles. Guerrant and Case took the mixed doubles set, 6–3, over Stewart and Brigitte Cuypers. Guerrant and Kerry Reid took the women's doubles set from Betty Stöve and Cuypers, 7–5. Reid squeaked past Stove in women's singles in a tiebreaker, 7–6. In the second match in Seattle on August 17, the Cascades dominated the match in winning 28–20 to stave off elimination. The Friars returned to San Diego for the third match on August 18, and fell to the Cascades, 31–20. Guerrant and Kerry Reid took the opening set of women's doubles, 7–6, against Stöve and Cuypers. But the Cascades won the next four sets to take the match and the series.

On November 8, 1978, Friars owner Frank Mariani announced that the team was folding. Mariani said that rebuilding the team, "will involve more expense than I am willing to undertake."

Season-by-season records
The following table shows regular season records, playoff results and titles won by the San Diego Friars.

Home courts
The following table shows home courts used by the San Diego Friars.

Individual honors
The following table shows individual honors bestowed upon players and coaches of the San Diego Friars.

Hall of Fame players
The following players who are enshrined in the International Tennis Hall of Fame played for the San Diego Friars:
 Rod Laver
 Dennis Ralston

Final roster
The San Diego Friars final roster for the 1978 season was
 Rod Laver, Player-Coach
 Larry Willens, Assistant Coach
 Ross Case
 Mona Guerrant
 Grover Raz Reid
 Kerry Reid
 Janet Young

See also

 World TeamTennis

References

External links
 Official World TeamTennis Website

Defunct World TeamTennis teams
1975 establishments in California
Tennis in California
Tennis teams in San Diego
1978 disestablishments in California
Sports clubs established in 1975
Sports clubs disestablished in 1978